Pakistan–South Africa relations refers to the current and historical relationship between the Republic of South Africa and the Islamic Republic of Pakistan. Both are former British possessions and full members of the Commonwealth of Nations.

Relations between South Africa and Pakistan are cordial and go back more than six decades. Since its independence, Pakistan has voiced its opposition against apartheid and racial discrimination in South Africa. Due to embargoes imposed against apartheid South Africa by the Commonwealth of Nations, the two nations did not establish official diplomatic relations until 1994, after the end of apartheid in South Africa. Relations between the two nations are cordial and amiable, and South Africa exports US$240 million worth of goods to Pakistan on a yearly basis. Pakistan exports slightly less to South Africa (US$210 million), with major items including cotton yarn, woven fabrics, leather, rice and textiles.

High Commissions

Pakistan has a High Commission in Pretoria.

South Africa has a High Commission in Islamabad.

Economic Relations

Trade and Investment

See also

 Pakistanis in South Africa
 Memons in South Africa

References

External links

 Pakistani High Commission in South Africa

 South African High Commission in Pakistan

 South African visa for Pakistani citizens

 
South Africa
South Africa
Bilateral relations of South Africa
Pakistan and the Commonwealth of Nations
South Africa and the Commonwealth of Nations